Good Clean Family Entertainment You Can Trust is a compilation album by the Danish rock group D-A-D, containing material from 1985 to 1995. The compilation was released on 9 November 1995.

Track listing
"Sleeping My Day Away"
"Bad Craziness"
"Jihad"
"Grow or Pay"
"Reconstrucdead"
"Laugh'n'A 1/2"
"Marlboro Man"
"Rim of Hell"
"Girl Nation"
"Point of View"
"Helpyourselfish"
"I Won't Cut My Hair (Live)"
"Riding with Sue (Live)"
"It's After Dark (Live)"
"Counting the Cattle"

External links
 This album on D-A-D's official homepage

1995 albums
D.A.D. (band) albums